Majevica is a low mountain range in northeastern Bosnia and Herzegovina. It is situated between Semberija, Posavina, and Tuzla Canton.
Its highest peak is Stolice, some 16 kilometres east of Tuzla, in the far southeastern part of the range.  Most of the range is located in the Federation of Bosnia and Herzegovina and part of it is in Republika Srpska. It is mostly forested.

History 
The area has been inhabited since prehistoric times, and is still populated today, with cities and towns located along the base of the range such as Srebrenik, Lopare, Čelić, Kalesija, and the regional center of Tuzla.

References 

Mountains of Republika Srpska
Mountains of Bosnia and Herzegovina